Wang He (born 16 April 1983) is a Chinese freestyle skier. She competed at the 2002 Winter Olympics and the 2006 Winter Olympics.

References

1983 births
Living people
Chinese female freestyle skiers
Olympic freestyle skiers of China
Freestyle skiers at the 2002 Winter Olympics
Freestyle skiers at the 2006 Winter Olympics
Place of birth missing (living people)